Motives 2: Retribution is a 2007 direct-to-video sequel to the 2004 thriller film Motives starring Brian J. White, Vivica A. Fox and Sean Blakemore.

Plot summary
The sequel to Motives picks up three years after the original. Emery Simms is a rarity—an innocent man in prison. On the outside, his ex-wife Connie is married to his best friend-turned-rival Brandon, and they're attempting to make a normal life. After Simms is killed during a brawl in prison, his brother Donovan returns to discover the real reason for his brother's death. The web of lies and murder may prove just as poisonous to Donovan as it was to his late brother.

Cast
 Brian J. White as Donovan Cook
 Vivica A. Fox as Constance "Connie" Simms
 Sean Blakemore as Brandon Collier
 Sharon Leal as Nina Welch
 Drew Sidora as René
 Joe Torry as Derrick Thompson 
 Mel Jackson as Detective Morgan 
 William L. Johnson as Ray
 Daya Vaidya as Sandra

External links 
 

2007 direct-to-video films
2007 films
Direct-to-video sequel films
Films produced by Will Packer
Rainforest Films films
2000s English-language films